Luca Pellegrini (born 24 March 1963) is an Italian former professional footballer who played as a defender.

Club career
Pellegrini was born in Varese. He played for 11 seasons (262 games, 3 goals) in the Serie A for U.C. Sampdoria, Hellas Verona F.C. and Torino F.C.

International career
Pellegrini represented Italy at the 1988 Summer Olympics (a swimmer with the same name also represented Italy at those Olympics).

Personal life
His younger brothers Davide Pellegrini and Stefano Pellegrini also played football professionally. To distinguish them, Luca was referred to as Pellegrini I, Davide as Pellegrini II and Stefano as Pellegrini III.

Honours
Sampdoria
 Serie A: 1990–91
 Coppa Italia: 1984–85, 1987–88, 1988–89
 UEFA Cup Winners' Cup: 1989–90

References

1963 births
Living people
Italian footballers
Association football defenders
Italy B international footballers
Italy under-21 international footballers
Olympic footballers of Italy
Footballers at the 1988 Summer Olympics
Serie A players
Serie B players
Serie C players
S.S.D. Varese Calcio players
U.C. Sampdoria players
Hellas Verona F.C. players
Ravenna F.C. players
Torino F.C. players